The 2013 British Speedway Championship was the 53rd edition of the British Speedway Championship. The Final took place on 13 May at Monmore Green in Wolverhampton, England. The Championship was won by Tai Woffinden, who beat defending champion Scott Nicholls, Chris Harris and Craig Cook in the final heat. It was the first time Woffinden had won the title.

Results

Semi-Final 1 
  Edinburgh
 19 April 2013

Semi-Final 2 
  Sheffield
 25 April 2013

The Final 
  Monmore Green Stadium, Wolverhampton
 13 May 2013

See also 
 British Speedway Championship

References 

British Speedway Championship
Great Britain